Dubai Creek Tower is a supported observation tower to be built in Dubai, United Arab Emirates. The preliminary cost of the tower is AED 3.67 billion. It was expected to be completed in 2022 at the earliest, but the completion date is unknown since, as of now, the tower is on hold because of the COVID-19 pandemic. The tower was initially known as The Tower at Dubai Creek Harbour.

The final height has not been disclosed, but project developer Emaar officially talks about a minimum height of at least , which will surpass the height of Burj Khalifa, Dubai's tallest skyscraper, and its arch-rival, the  Kingdom Tower in Saudi Arabia. Upon completion, it will become the tallest supported tower in the world.

Concept
Aurecon, the engineering firm working on the project stated that Dubai's new tallest tower will emit a 'beacon of light' from its peak at night.  At the top will be an oval-shaped bud, housing ten observation decks, including The Pinnacle Room, which will offer 360-degree views of the city, according to a statement from engineering firm Aurecon, which is working with Spanish architect Santiago Calatrava on the project.
"The Tower will test the craftsmanship of Aurecon as we play our part in making a mark on the built fabric of mankind," said Adrian Jones, Aurecon's project director for The Tower.
"It is an absolute privilege to be entrusted by Santiago Calatrava and Emaar Properties to work on this project, and we have assembled a stellar team to bring this idea to life."
The design includes a distinctive net of steel cable stays that attach to a central reinforced concrete core that will reach into the sky.

Emaar Properties chairman Mohamed Alabbar described the new project as an "elegant monument" which is going to add value to property being developed by the company along the city's creek. "The tower will be slender, evoking the image of a minaret, and will be anchored to the ground with sturdy cables.

On 15 January 2017, a revised model of the original design was displayed at the Sales Center of the complex. The Observation deck height and the floor count was increased.

In February 2017, a rendering of the Tower appeared, which depicted it as a building supported by cables. Also, in one article, it was announced that the name of the tower will be Creek Tower.

The tower was initially expected to open in time for the Expo 2020 event in Dubai, but the COVID-19 Pandemic has delayed both the Expo and the tower's construction.

Construction

In October 2016, Mohammed bin Rashid Al Maktoum attended the groundbreaking for the tower which began the tower's construction with the planned opening being in 2025.

A video showing the construction so far was released in August 2017. In May 2018, BESIX subsidiary Six Construct completed the foundations for the Tower. Construction of the main part of the tower did not commence after the foundations were completed. As of July 2019, the tender process to award the construction contract for the project was still ongoing.

On April 4, 2020, Emaar Properties, developer of the Tower and surrounding area, halted construction temporarily due to the COVID-19 pandemic. At that time, no construction activity had occurred on the site of Dubai Creek Tower for almost two years. All mentions and renders of the tower were removed from the project's website at some point during July or August 2020. As of December 7, 2020, the suspension of construction was declared indefinitely until the government allows work to resume once the pandemic is under control.

References

External links
 Dubai Creek Tower at Emaar website
 Dubai Creek Tower official launch video
 The Skyscraper Center database

Proposed buildings and structures in Dubai
Architecture in Dubai
Neo-futurism architecture
High-tech architecture
Islamic architecture
Observation towers
Santiago Calatrava structures